Harry J. Barnhart (September 19, 1890 – December 28, 1961) was an American football and basketball coach. He served as the head football coach at the University of Findlay in Findlay, Ohio from 1915 to 1916 and again from 1927 to 1931, compiling a record of 17–31–1. Barnhart was also the head basketball coach at Findsaly from 1910 to 1918 and 1927 to 1932, tallying a mark of 82–85.

References

External links
 

1890 births
1961 deaths
Findlay Oilers football coaches
Findlay Oilers men's basketball coaches
People from Wooster, Ohio
Basketball coaches from Ohio